Scythris snymani is a moth of the family Scythrididae. It was described by Bengt Å. Bengtsson in 2014. It is found in South Africa (Northern Cape) and Zimbabwe.

References

snymani
Moths described in 2014